Sebastian Ahrenberg, better known as Seba is a Swedish drum and bass producer and DJ Seba is also the owner of Secret Operations, a drum and bass record label.

Musical career
Seba's first professional release was Sonic Winds, a collaboration with Lo-tek on LTJ Bukem's Good Looking Records in 1995.  The duo released Universal Music on Good Looking, after which Seba went on to produce a string of solo releases on various Bukem-owned labels.

Secret Operations
In 1997 Seba created a night club named  Secret Operations in the basement club Tuben in central Stockholm. Two years later Operations released Case One, a CD compilation of works by Seba (under the pseudonym Forme) and other artists.

Svek
From 1999 to 2003, Ahrenberg has released a number of mostly house music works on the Swedish Svek label attributed to Seba and Forme.  He has also joined with Jesper Dahlbäck (aka Lenk) for the collaborative house music effort known as Sunday Brunch.  The two would release a number of tunes on vinyl as well as full length CD entitled No Resistance in 2002.

Return to drum and bass
In 2002, Seba began releasing drum and bass records again. For the first time on his own Secret Operations label as well as various others.    While no longer under Bukem's eye, Seba's music retained its deep atmospheric sound while sometimes adding a more aggressive edge not often heard in his earlier works.  Operations first release was Pieces, a collaboration between Seba, Lenk and an uncredited Robert Manos as vocalist.  Manos had previously recorded with the duo for Sunday Brunch, but this was the first of many times he would join Ahrenberg on a drum and bass project.

Sebadox era
In 2004 Seba joined forces with drumfunk all-star Paradox, and the two put out a large number of albums from 2004-2006, with 2005 seeing an especially large amount of releases.  A compilation of their work during this time was released on the CD Beats Me in 2006.   Vocalist Robert Manos also contributed his talents to a number of works during this time frame.

Selected discography

Studio albums
 Return to Forever (2008)
 Identity (2013)
 Ingaro (2022)

Singles and EPs
 Seba & Lo-tek - Sonic Winds / So Long - 1996
 Seba & Lo-tek - Universal Music - 1997
 Seba - Connected / Catch the Moment - 1998
 Seba - Planetary Funk Alert / Camouflage - 1998
 Seba - Valley of the Moomins - 1998
 Seba - Waveform / Soul 2000 - 1999
 Sunday Brunch - Honung - 1999
 Sunday Brunch - After the Rain - 2000
 Seba & Lenk - Pieces - 2002
 Seba - Make My Way Home - 2003
 Seba & Lenk (featuring Robert Manos) - 16 Stories - 2004
 Seba & Paradox - You Didn't See It Did You? - 2004
 Seba & Paradox (featuring Robert Manos) - Move On - 2005
 Seba & Paradox (featuring Robert Manos) - Last Goodbye - 2005
 Seba - Forever - 2006
 Seba (featuring Robert Manos) - Heaven Sent - 2006
 Seba & Krazy - Nebula - 2007
 Seba - Return To Forever - 2008
 Seba & Kirsty Hawkshaw - The Joy (Face to Face) - 2010
 Seba - Welcome To Our World - 2011
 Seba - Identity - 2013

References

External links
 Secret Operations
 

Drum and bass musicians
Swedish male musicians